In algebraic geometry, a Cox ring is a sort of universal homogeneous coordinate ring for a projective variety, and is (roughly speaking) a direct sum of the spaces of sections of all isomorphism classes of line bundles.

References

 
 
Algebraic geometry